Caloptilia protiella is a moth of the family Gracillariidae. It is known from China (Hong Kong, Guangdong, Jiangxi and Hainan), India, Java, Japan (Kyūshū and the Ryukyu Islands), Malaysia and Thailand.

The wingspan is 10.5-12.5 mm.

The larvae feed on Anacardium occidentale, Toxicodendron succedaneum, Toxicodendron sylvestre and Protium javanicum. They probably mine the leaves of their host plant.

References

protiella
Moths of Asia
Moths described in 1904